Cynthia Sara Nilson (born August 22, 1970), also known as Cynthia Nilson is an Argentine two-time Grammy Award-nominated pop singer and songwriter and The Sacados female voice since 1995.

Career 
She began singing professionally with her father Carlos Nilson in several songs for Argentine television shows like Ritmo de la Noche starring  Marcelo Tinelli, Jugate Conmigo and Verano del '98 with Cris Morena. In the 1990s she began performing with her own rock bands until 1995 the Argentinian pop group The Sacados hired Cynthia Nilson to sing and play keyboards during their Colombian tour with Shakira and since then  she became The Sacados  female voice  until present . She also sang the lead song of Verano del '98, a hit song from a famous television series. She has collaborated in many records as a writer and singer with Julio Iglesias, Ricardo Montaner, Azúcar Moreno, Alexandre Pires, Kelly Clarkson, Shaila Durcal, Noelia, Patricia Manterola, Aracely Arambula, Tierra Cero, Ninel Conde, Twiggy, Machito Ponce, Cynthia, Kika, Edgar, Pilar Montegro, and Don Omar. She also wrote music for other Mexican television series, including La Jaula de Oro and El Amor no tiene Precio. She is an ASCAP award winner and has been nominated for several Grammy Awards. Cynthia Nilson appears on the 90s Pop Tour vol  2 cd and DVD, and on the new 2019 90s pop CD /DVD 90s Tour Volumen 3.

Personal life 
Cynthia is married to Darío Moscatelli, Music Producer and The Sacados leader. She lives in Miami, Florida with her husband and children.

Discography
1996 - Laberinto de Canciones (The Sacados) BMG
1998 - Mucho Mejor (The Sacados) BMG
1998 - Verano del 98 Sony Music
1999 -  Verano del 98 (2) Sony Music 
2003 - Estrella Guia (Alexandre Pires) ASCAP Award Winner and 2 Grammy Awards Nominee.
2000 - De Onda (The sacados)  BMG
2006 - Navidad con Amigos   EMI Televisa
2006 - 40 grados (Noelia) (songwriter & background vocals)
2006 - Dispuesto an amarte (Luciano Pereyra) EMI
2007 - Volverte a ver (Noelia) 2007 EMI TELEVISA
2007 - Bailando con Lola (Azucar Moreno) Emi ( songwriter & background vocals)
2008 - La musica de los Valores TELEVISA /
2010 - Superexitos (The Sacados) 2010 Independiente, iTunes, Amazon.
2011 - Las cosas son como son (Ricardo Montaner) 2011 EMI (songwriter & background vocals)
2012 - El Viajero Frecuente (Ricardo Montaner 2012 Sony Music) Background Vocals
2014 - Agradecido (Ricardo Montaner) Sony Music
2016 - Ida y vuelta (Ricardo Montaner) Sony Music
2017 - Inmenso -Puma Rodriguez Sony Music 
2018 90s Pop Tout Vol 2, Sony Music .The Sacados 
2019 90s Pop Tour Vol 3 . The Sacados

References

External links

Argentine people of Swedish descent
Living people
20th-century Argentine women singers
1970 births
21st-century Argentine women singers